Water in the Well may refer to:

"Water in the Well", song by Spirit of the West from 1990 album Save This House
"Water in the Well", song by Shame from Drunk Tank Pink